Tarom Sara (also Romanized as Ţārom Sarā; also known as Tarmī Sarā) is a village in Shabkhus Lat Rural District, Rankuh District, Amlash County, Gilan Province, Iran. At the 2006 census, its population was 16, in 6 families.

References 

Populated places in Amlash County